The Moraceae — often called the mulberry family or fig family — are a family of flowering plants comprising about 38 genera and over 1100 species. Most are widespread in tropical and subtropical regions, less so in temperate climates; however, their distribution is cosmopolitan overall. The only synapomorphy within the Moraceae is presence of laticifers and milky sap in all parenchymatous tissues, but generally useful field characters include two carpels sometimes with one reduced, compound inconspicuous flowers, and compound fruits.  The family includes well-known plants such as the fig, banyan, breadfruit, jackfruit, mulberry, and Osage orange. The 'flowers' of Moraceae are often pseudanthia (reduced inflorescences).

Description

Flowers
The individual flowers are often small, with single whorled or absent perianth. Most flowers have either petals or sepals, but not both, known as monochlamydeae, and have pistils and stamens in different flowers, known as diclinous. Except for Brosimum gaudichaudii and Castilla elastica, the perianth in all species of the Moraceae contain sepals. If the flower has an inflexed stamen, then pollen is released and distributed by wind dispersal; however, if the stamen is straight, then insect pollination is most likely to occur. Insect pollination occurs in Antiaropsis, Artocarpus, Castilla, Dorstenia, Ficus, and Mesogyne.

Leaves
The leaves are much like the flowers when analyzing diversity. The leaves can be singly attached to the stem or alternating, they may be lobed or unlobed, and can be evergreen or deciduous depending on the species in question. The red mulberry can host numerous leaf types on the same tree. Leaves can be both lobed and unlobed and appear very different, but coexist on the same plant.

Fruits and seeds
Plant species in the Moraceae are best known for their fruits. Overall, most species produced a fleshy fruit containing seeds. Examples include the breadfruit from Artocarpus altillis, the mulberry from Morus rubra, the fig from Ficus carica, and the jackfruit from Artocarpus heterophyllus.

Taxonomy
Formerly included within the now defunct order Urticales, recent molecular studies have resulted in the family's placement within the Rosales in a clade called the urticalean rosids that also includes Ulmaceae, Celtidaceae, Cannabaceae, and Urticaceae. Cecropia, which has variously been placed in the Moraceae, Urticaceae, or their own family, Cecropiaceae, is now included in the Urticaceae.

Dioecy (having individuals with separate sexes) appears to be the primitive state in Moraceae. Monoecy has evolved independently at least four times within the family.

Phylogeny
Modern molecular phylogenetics suggest these relationships:

Tribes and genera
Moraceae is comprised of six extant subfamiles and several tribes:

Artocarpeae 
 Artocarpus  (c. 50 spp.)
 Batocarpus  (4 spp.)
 Clarisia  (3 spp.)
 Hullettia  (2 spp.)
 Parartocarpus  (3 spp.)
 Prainea  (4 spp.)
 Treculia  (3 spp.)
Castilleae 
Antiaropsineae 
 Antiaropsis  (1 sp.)
 Sparattosyce  (1 sp.)
Castillineae 
 Antiaris  (1 sp.)
 Castilla  (3 spp.)
 Helicostylis  (7 spp.)
 Maquira  (5 spp.)
 Mesogyne  (1 sp.)
 Naucleopsis  (c. 20 spp.)
 Perebea  (9 spp.)
 Poulsenia  (1 sp.)
 Pseudolmedia  (c. 9 spp.)
Dorstenieae 
 Bleekrodea  (3 spp.)
 Bosqueiopsis  (1 sp.)
 Brosimum  (13 spp.)
 Broussonetia  (8 spp.)
 Dorstenia  (c. 105 spp.)
 Fatoua  (3 spp.)
 Helianthostylis  (2 spp.) – synonym of Brosimum
 Malaisia  (1 sp.)
 Scyphosyce  (2 spp.)
 Sloetia  (1 sp.)
 Trilepisium  (1 sp.)
 Trymatococcus  (2 spp.) – synonym of Brosimum
 Utsetela  (1 sp.)
Ficeae 
Ficus  (750 spp.)
Maclureae 
 Maclura  (11 spp.)
Moreae 
 Bagassa  (1 sp.)
 Milicia  (2 spp.)
 Morus  (c. 12 spp.)
 Sorocea  (22 spp.)
 Streblus  (c. 24 spp.)
 Trophis  (8 spp.)

Other genera accepted by Plants of the World Online :

Afromorus 
Allaeanthus 
Ampalis 
Antiaropsis 
Brosimum 
Calaunia 
Castilla 
Hijmania 
Maillardia 
Maquira 
Olmedia 
Paratrophis 
Pseudostreblus 
Sloetiopsis 
Sparattosyce 
Taxotrophis

Fossil genera and species
In addition to the living species, a number of fossil genera have been ascribed to the family:

 Aginoxylon 
Aginoxylon moroides 
 †Artocarpidium 
 †Artocarpoides 
 †Arthmiocarpus 
 †Artocarpoxylon 
 †Becktonia 
 †Becktonia hantonensis 
 †Cornerocarpon 
 †Cornerocarpon copiosum 
 †Coussapoites 
 †Coussapoites veracruzianus 
 †Cudranioxylon 
 †Cudranioxylon engolismense 
 †Ficofolium  
 †Ficofolium weylandii  
 †Ficonium 
 †Ficonium nitidum 
 †Ficonium silesiacum 
 †Ficonium solanderi 
 †Milicioxylon 
 †Milicioxylon kachchhense 
 †Moraceoipollenites 
 †Moricites 
 †Moroidea 
 †Moroidea baltica 
 †Moroidea caucasica 
 †Moroidea cretacea 
 †Moroidea hordwellensis 
 †Moroidea reticulata 
 †Moroidea tymensis 
 †Moroxylon 
 †Myrianthoxylon 
Myrianthoxylon chaloneri 
 †Ovicarpum 
 †Palaeokalopanax 
†Palaeokalopanax kamtschaticus 
†Palaeokalopanax vollosovitschii 
 †Paleoficus 
 †Protoficus 
†Protoficus crenulata 
†Protoficus crispans 
†Protoficus dentatus 
†Protoficus insignis 
†Protoficus lacera 
†Protoficus nervosa 
†Protoficus saportae 
†Protoficus sezannensis 
 †Soroceaxylon 
Soroceaxylon entrerriense 
 †Ungerites  (syn Ficoxylon)
†Ungerites tropicus 
 †Welkoetoxylon 
†Welkoetoxylon multiseriatum

Distribution
Moraceae can be found throughout the world with a cosmopolitan distribution, thought to be due to the breakup of Gondwana during the Jurassic period. The majority of species originate in the Old World tropics, particularly in Asia and the Pacific islands.

References

External links 

 Moraceae in L. Watson and M.J. Dallwitz (1992 onwards). The families of flowering plants.

 
Rosales
Rosid families
Extant Campanian first appearances